Ruraldale may refer to:

 Ruraldale, Ohio, an unincorporated community in Muskingum County
 Ruraldale, West Virginia, an unincorporated community in Upshur County